Declaration of Independence is an EP by alternative rock band No Americana.

Track listing

References
 https://web.archive.org/web/20110607210354/http://www.circlepit.tv/album-reviews/no-americana-declaration-of-independence
 http://www.sonicabuse.com/2011/05/no-americana-declaration-of-independence-ep-review/
 https://web.archive.org/web/20110529001033/http://www.sonicshocks.com/NO-AMERICANA-Declaration-of-Independence.php

2011 EPs
No Americana albums